The 1976 United States Senate election in Utah took place on November 2, 1976. Incumbent Democratic U.S. Senator Frank Moss ran for re-election to a fourth term but was defeated by his Republican opponent Orrin Hatch. 40 years after the election, Hatch eventually became the longest-serving Republican Senator, having been re-elected for seven terms before retiring following the 2018 election. This record was later overtaken by Chuck Grassley of Iowa in 2022.

Major Candidates

Democratic
Frank Moss, Incumbent U.S. Senator since 1959

Republican
Orrin Hatch
Sherman P. Lloyd, former U.S. Representative

Results

See also 
 1976 United States Senate elections

References

Bibliography
 
 

Utah
1976
1976 Utah elections